Andrew Halliday may refer to:

 Andrew Halliday (journalist) (1830–1877), Scottish journalist and dramatist
 Sir Andrew Halliday (physician) (1782–1839), Scottish physician, reformer, and writer
 Andy Halliday (born 1991), Scottish footballer

See also
 Andrew Hallidie (disambiguation)